The 1950 Campeonato Nacional de Fútbol Profesional was Chilean first tier’s 18th season. Everton were the champions, being the first team from outside Santiago to win the national league.

Previous to the start of the tournament Ferroviarios and Badminton merged to form Ferrobadminton.

The tournament was played in a Round-robin tournament system.

Scores

Standings

Championship playoff
Everton and Unión Española ended up tied in points at the end of the 22 weeks of regular season. Tournament rules establish that, unlike any other position on the table, if two or more teams are equal in points at the end of play, goal difference does not count and a playoff game is required. Everton won that match and was crowned as champion.

Topscorer

Sources
 Chile 1950 (RSSSF)

1950
Chile
Primera